Japan competed at the 2014 Summer Youth Olympics, in Nanjing, China from 16 August to 28 August 2014.

Medalists

|  style="text-align:left; width:78%; vertical-align:top;"|

|  style="text-align:left; width:22%; vertical-align:top;"|

Archery

Japan qualified a two archers from its performance at the 2013 World Archery Youth Championships.

Individual

Team

Athletics

Japan qualified 13 athletes.

Qualification Legend: Q=Final A (medal); qB=Final B (non-medal); qC=Final C (non-medal); qD=Final D (non-medal); qE=Final E (non-medal)

Boys
Track & road events

Field Events

Girls
Track & road events

Field events

Badminton

Japan qualified two athletes based on the 2 May 2014 BWF Junior World Rankings.

Singles

Doubles

Boxing

Japan qualified three boxers based on its performance at the 2014 AIBA Youth World Championships

Boys

Canoeing

Japan qualified one boat based on its performance at the 2013 World Junior Canoe Sprint and Slalom Championships.

Girls

Cycling

Japan qualified a boys' and girls' team based on its ranking issued by the UCI.

Team

Mixed Relay

Equestrian

Japan qualified a rider.

Fencing

Japan qualified three athletes based on its performance at the 2014 FIE Cadet World Championships.

Girls

Mixed Team

Field Hockey

Japan qualified a girls' team based on its performance at the 2013 Under 16 Asian Cup.

Girls' Tournament

Roster

 Yu Asai
 Chiko Fujibayashi
 Kimika Hoshi
 Mami Karino
 Motomi Kawamura
 Miki Kozuka
 Mori Kanon
 Eika Nakamura
 Moeka Tsubouchi

Group Stage

Quarterfinal

Semifinal

Bronze medal match

Golf

Japan qualified one team of two athletes based on the 8 June 2014 IGF Combined World Amateur Golf Rankings.

Individual

Team

Gymnastics

Artistic Gymnastics

Japan qualified two athletes based on its performance at the 2014 Asian Artistic Gymnastics Championships.

Boys

Girls

Rhythmic Gymnastics

Japan qualified one athlete based on its performance at the 2014 Asian Rhythmic Championships.

Individual

Trampoline

Japan qualified one athlete based on its performance at the 2014 Asian Trampoline Championships.

Judo

Japan qualified two athletes based on its performance at the 2013 Cadet World Judo Championships.

Individual

Team

Rowing

Japan qualified one boat based on its performance at the Asian Qualification Regatta.

Qualification Legend: FA=Final A (medal); FB=Final B (non-medal); FC=Final C (non-medal); FD=Final D (non-medal); SA/B=Semifinals A/B; SC/D=Semifinals C/D; R=Repechage

Rugby Sevens

Japan qualified a boys' team based on its performance at the 2013 Rugby World Cup Sevens.

Boys' Tournament

Roster

 Ryusuke Funahashi
 Shimin Kohara
 Toshiki Kuwayama
 Doga Maeda
 Eiya Miyazaki
 Kosuke Naka
 Shogo Nakano
 Yuhei Shimada
 Koki Takeyama
 Shun Tomonaga
 Kohei Toyoda
 Kazuki Yamada

Group Stage

Placing 5–6

Sailing

Japan qualified two boats based on its performance at the Techno 293 Asian Continental Qualifiers.

Shooting

Japan was given a wild card to compete.

Individual

Team

Swimming

Japan qualified eight swimmers.

Boys

Girls

Mixed

Table Tennis

Japan qualified a girl based on its performance at the 2014 World Qualification Event and a boy based on the Under-18 World Rankings.

Singles

Team

Qualification Legend: Q=Main Bracket (medal); qB=Consolation Bracket (non-medal)

Tennis

Japan qualified two athletes based on the 9 June 2014 ITF World Junior Rankings.

Singles

Doubles

Triathlon

Japan qualified two athletes based on its performance at the 2014 Asian Youth Olympic Games Qualifier.

Individual

Relay

Wrestling

Japan qualified two athletes based on its performance at the 2014 Asian Cadet Championships.

Boys

Girls

References

2014 in Japanese sport
Nations at the 2014 Summer Youth Olympics
Japan at the Youth Olympics